Kilimanjaro Region (Mkoa wa Kilimanjaro in Swahili) is one of Tanzania's 31 administrative regions. The regional capital and largest city is the municipality of Moshi. With an HDI of 0.613, Kilimanjaro is one among the most developed regions of Tanzania. According to the 2012 national census, the region had a population of 1,640,087, which was lower than the pre-census projection of 1,702,207. For 2002-2012, the region's 1.8 percent average annual population growth rate was the 24th highest in the country. It was also the eighth most densely populated region with 124 people per square kilometer.

The region forms part of the Northern Tourism Circuit in Tanzania. It is home to the Kilimanjaro National Park (which contains Mount Kilimanjaro), the Mkomazi National Park, the Pare Mountains, Lake Jipe, and Lake Chala. The region is bordered to the north and east by Kenya, to the south by the Tanga Region, to the southwest by the Manyara Region, and to the west by the Arusha Region.

Administrative divisions

Districts
Kilimanjaro Region is divided into one city and six districts, each administered by a council, except Moshi District which has two, one of which serves as the capital of the region.

History

Kilimanjaro Region was officially established in 1963 with two districts: Kilimanjaro and Pare. The region was part of the Northern Province in the pre-independence Tanganyika. Northern Province’s districts included Arusha and Mbulu, while Pare District was a part of Tanga Province.

Of the region's six districts, four traditionally had Chagga settlements, which are Hai District, Moshi District, Rombo District, and Siha District. The other two, Mwanga District and Same District, have historically included Pare settlements. However, during colonial rule in the late 19th century to the middle of the 20th century, the region was divided into two main districts: Moshi district, which was composed of all the areas settled by the Chagga people on the slopes of the mountain, and Pare district, which was a Pare tribe settlement. The region, from earlier times, had been settled by the people collectively called the Chagga, the Maasai, Wakwavi, and Waarusha (in the lower parts of Mount Kilimanjaro), and the Pare on the Pare mountains. These have been intermingling, trading, and even fighting from time to time for various socio-political reasons. Later, other tribes also migrated to the area.

Geology

The activity that created this stratovolcano dates back less than a million years. Steam and sulphur fumaroles here are indicative of residual activity.

At present only a small fraction of the glacial cover remains.

Notable people
 Nandy, Tanzanian singer
 Maua Sama, Tanzanian singer
 Nathaniel Mtui, first Tanzanian historian
 Freeman Mbowe, Tanzanian Politician
 Cleopa Msuya, 3rd Tanzanian Prime Minister
 Bruno Tarimo, Tanzanian boxer
 Irene Tarimo, Tanzanian scientist

See also
 Chagga people
 Kilimanjaro National Park
 Marangu
 Mkomazi National Park
 Moshi, Tanzania
 Pare people
 Pare Mountains
 Lake Chala

References

External links

  

 
Regions of Tanzania
States and territories established in 1963